The men's pole vault event at the 2008 World Junior Championships in Athletics was held in Bydgoszcz, Poland, at Zawisza Stadium on 10 and 12 July.

Medalists

Results

Final
12 July

Qualifications
10 July

Group A

Group B

Participation
According to an unofficial count, 23 athletes from 16 countries participated in the event.

References

Pole vault
Pole vault at the World Athletics U20 Championships